The View from Daniel Pike was a Scottish television drama series in the early 1970s, which starred Roddy McMillan as the eponymous title character, a hard-boiled private detective based in Glasgow, and was written by Edward Boyd. Some of the stories were adapted into book form.

References

External links
 The View From Daniel Pike dvd blog
 
 Profile on thrillingdetective.com

Pike, Daniel
Television shows set in Glasgow
1970s Scottish television series
1970s British drama television series
1971 Scottish television series debuts
1973 Scottish television series endings